"Die besten Tage sind Gezählt" is the first single released by German hip-hop artist Kool Savas from the album of the same name. The track features US R&B artist Lumidee singing the chorus and is produced by Melbeatz.

Track listing
 German CD Single
 "Die besten Tage sind gezählt" - 4:17
 "Weiso" - 2:48

Chart performance
This song debuted at 91 on the Swiss Top 75 and spent 1 week. It also charted on the German Top 100, debuting at number 31, spending 8 consecutive weeks at that position until it dropped from the chart.

References

Kool Savas songs
Lumidee songs
Songs written by Lumidee
2004 singles
2004 songs